Police Academy 2: Their First Assignment is a 1985 American comedy film directed by Jerry Paris. It is the second installment in the Police Academy franchise and the sequel to Police Academy.

Many actors return from the first film to respectively reprise their roles.  Steve Guttenberg reprises his role as Officer Carey Mahoney, the class clown; former American football player Bubba Smith returns as the colossal Moses Hightower; Marion Ramsey is featured again as Laverne Hooks; David Graf returns as gun-crazy Officer Eugene Tackleberry; Michael Winslow returns as sound effects master Officer Larvell Jones, and veteran actor George Gaynes returns as Commandant Eric Lassard.

New faces in Police Academy 2 include Howard Hesseman as Captain Pete Lassard (the brother of Police Academy commandant Eric Lassard); Bobcat Goldthwait as Zed, the leader of "The Scullions", an obnoxious gang; Art Metrano as Lt. Mauser; Peter Van Norden as slobbish police dog Officer Vinnie Schtulman; Tim Kazurinsky as hapless business owner Carl Sweetchuck; and Lance Kinsey as Sgt. Proctor. In the film, the Police Academy cadets have graduated and are assigned to the worst precinct in town, where they have to help Captain Pete Lassard fight Zed's gang.

Plot
After a random attack by "The Scullions," a gang led by Zed McGlunk (Bobcat Goldthwait), Chief Henry Hurst (George R. Robertson) goes to the 16th precinct, telling Captain Pete Lassard (Howard Hesseman) the precinct is the worst in the city. Lassard protests as his officers are understaffed and old, and can no longer get the job done.

Hurst gives him 30 days to turn the precinct around or he is out. Before he leaves, Lieutenant Mauser (Art Metrano) asks for promotion to Captain if Lassard fails. Capt. Lassard calls his brother Eric (George Gaynes) at the Police Academy, asking him for six recruits. Mauser is seen talking with his dim-witted partner, Sgt. Proctor (Lance Kinsey), as he attempts to take control of the precinct.

The Commandant's top graduates Carey Mahoney (Steve Guttenberg), Larvell Jones (Michael Winslow), Eugene Tackleberry (David Graf), Moses Hightower (Bubba Smith), Laverne Hooks (Marion Ramsey), and Douglas Fackler (Bruce Mahler) arrive from the police academy and join the 16th precinct with some of them assigned to a veteran officer partner. Fackler is assigned to Dooley (Ed Herlihy), Jones to Sistrunk (Sandy Ward), Mahoney to Vinnie Schtulman (Peter Van Norden), and Tackleberry to Sgt. Kathleen Kirkland (Colleen Camp). Tackleberry later confides to Mahoney that he may have fallen in love with Kirkland.

Mauser undermines them, especially Mahoney. On patrol, Mahoney and Schtulman spot a robbery, but the robbers escape as confusion is caused in part by other responding officers. Mauser is about to suspend them, but Mahoney's passionate plea convinces Lassard to give them another chance. Simultaneously, Zed and his gang go "shopping" in a supermarket, causing havoc and chaos.

Mahoney is reassigned by Mauser to patrol a tunnel, resulting in him and his partner being covered with soot. In revenge he switches Mauser's shampoo with epoxy from a helmet repair kit, gluing Mauser's hands to his hair. He embarrasses himself in front of the station and has to wear a wig throughout the remainder of the film. Capt. Lassard spots some of Zed's men and tries to deal with them, but is over-powered and spray-painted. This humiliation emboldens him to allow the precinct to use "whatever means possible" to contain the gang. Progress is made and most of the gang is captured at The Blue Oyster Bar, but most of the charges are dropped due to excessive force and procedure violations. Mahoney realises Mauser did this on purpose so, in revenge, he requests a body cavity search for him.

Later, Tackleberry goes dancing with Kirkland. They profess their love for each other and make love (after removing their numerous concealed weapons). Captain Lassard goes to see his brother Eric, who comes up with the idea to hold a fair. However, Zed's men trash it, so Lassard is out of a job the next day and Mauser is promoted to captain. His first act is to remove Mahoney, and then Schtulman when he objects to Mahoney's dismissal.

Mahoney, Schtulman, and Lassard get together in a last-ditch attempt to stop the gang. Mahoney goes undercover to infiltrate the gang. Lassard and Schtulman wire him with a Mr. Microphone. As "Jughead," formerly of the gang "The Archies", he infiltrates the gang, finding out both their hiding spot (the abandoned Griffith Park Zoo) and the name of their leader. However, his cover is blown when the microphone cuts into a radio ad, leading to Captain Lassard calling every man to the location. The officers arrive, but are stopped by Mauser.

Mauser attempts to conduct a raid, but Fackler bumps him into an air duct, leading to his capture by Zed and his gang. The officers stage their own raid, overpowering and arresting the gang. Zed attempts to escape with Mahoney, but Lassard blocks him, preparing to shoot Zed. However, Mahoney punches Zed down stairs, where Hooks arrests him. Lassard's gun was not loaded, as he "hasn't carried live ammo since '73". He is later reinstated as captain, as are Mahoney and Schtulman on the force, while Mauser is demoted back to lieutenant.

The officers (including the re-instated Lassard) attend Tackleberry and Kirkland's wedding. They drive off in the monster truck Bigfoot.

Cast

The Six New 16th Precinct Officers 
 Steve Guttenberg as Officer Carey Mahoney
 Bubba Smith as Officer Moses Hightower
 David Graf as Officer Eugene Tackleberry
 Michael Winslow as Officer Larvell Jones
 Bruce Mahler as Officer Douglas Fackler
 Marion Ramsey as Officer Laverne Hooks

The Rest Of The 16th Precinct 
 Colleen Camp as Corporal Kathleen Kirkland
 Art Metrano as Lieutenant Ernie Mauser
 Howard Hesseman as Captain Pete Lassard
 Peter Van Norden as Officer Vinnie Schtulman
 Ed Herlihy as Officer Dooley
 Lance Kinsey as Sergeant Carl Proctor

Other 
 George Gaynes as Commandant Eric Lassard
 George R. Robertson as Chief Henry J. Hurst
 Sandy Ward as Sistrunk
 Julie Brown as Chloe
 Tim Kazurinsky as Carl Sweetchuck
 Arthur Batanides as Mr. Kirkland
 Jackie Joseph as Mrs. Kirkland
 Andrew Paris as Bud Kirkland
 Jennifer Darling as The Mayor
 Lucy Lee Flippin as Mom In Car
 Jason Hervey as Brian
 Diana Bellamy as Nurse
 Rich Hall as Street Punk
 Jim Reid Boyce as Michael, The Preppy Guy
 Diana Bellamy as Body Cavity Search Nurse

The Scullions 
 Bobcat Goldthwait as Zed McGlunk (billed as Bob Goldthwait)
 Christopher Jackson as "Mojo"
 Church Ortiz as "Flacko"

Production 
The first film had cost $4.8 million but the second was $7.5 million. Producer Paul Maslansky said the difference was due to filming in Los Angeles rather than Toronto, as in the original. "Shooting in Los Angeles is expensive," he said. "Not because of the city officials; they provide every cooperation. It's the merchants and the property owners who can really hit you. There's so much filming going on that they ask a lot of money for location sites, parking, etc." Maslansky also said "Naturally the actors wanted more money to do the sequel. The above-the- line (principal talent) costs are about a million and a half, and that includes my own fee." He added "We lost some time because I had to change directors after a couple of weeks. But Jerry Paris... has done a great job of catching up."

"I wasn't too sold on doing the sequel," said Guttenberg. "I didn't think the script was as good as the first one. But it has been improved, and after I talked with Paul, I decided to give it another try."

Reception

Box office 
Police Academy 2: Their First Assignment opened on 1,613 screens, grossing $10,675,896 in its opening weekend, setting a record for March. It was the 11th highest-grossing film in the United States in 1985 with a total of $55.6 million. The film grossed $115 million worldwide and made a profit of $20.5 million.

Critical response 
The film received negative reviews. On Rotten Tomatoes, the film has an approval rating of 29% based on 17 reviews. On Metacritic, the film has a score of 39 out of 100 based on reviews from 8 critics, indicating "Generally unfavorable reviews".
	
Variety wrote: "Follow-up features much of the original’s cast but none of its key behind-the-scenes creative talent, save producer Paul Maslansky. Only actor to get any mileage out of this one is series newcomer Art Metrano, as an ambitious lieutenant bent upon taking over the department." Variety had little praise for the film, except "Metrano somehow manages to shine in these murkiest of circumstances, and Michael Winslow has a couple of good moments".
Film critic Leonard Maltin gave the movie a BOMB rating (the first of 5 for the series), saying, "There are Dragnet episodes that are funnier than this movie." Siskel & Ebert included it on a 1985 episode of their TV show that focused entirely on terrible sequels, though Gene noted it had two more laughs in it than the 1984 first film did (which meant the sequel had exactly two laughs).

References

External links 
 
 
 
 

1985 films
1980s police comedy films
American sequel films
1980s English-language films
 2
Films shot in Toronto
Warner Bros. films
The Ladd Company films
Films scored by Robert Folk
Films directed by Jerry Paris
Films with screenplays by Barry W. Blaustein
Films with screenplays by David Sheffield
1985 comedy films
Films produced by Paul Maslansky
1980s American films